RPM was a Canadian magazine that published the best-performing singles of Canada from 1964 to 2000. Thirty-two songs peaked at number one this year, starting with "Do They Know It's Christmas?" by Band Aid and ending with "Say You, Say Me" by Lionel Richie. Not counting the number-one single from the magazine's first issue, "Do They Know It's Christmas?" was the first song to debut at number one on the RPM Singles Chart. Excluding the musical acts composing Band Aid, Northern Lights, and USA for Africa, 19 different artists reached the top spot for the first time in 1985.

This year, three artists earned more than one chart-topping single: Phil Collins, Madonna, and Tears for Fears. The three Canadian acts that peaked atop the chart in 1985 were supergroup Northern Lights, Corey Hart, and Platinum Blonde. Hart's single "Never Surrender" spent four weeks at number one and was the best-selling hit of the year. Foreigner, Tears for Fears, John Parr, and supergroup USA for Africa each topped the magazine's chart for three issues with their singles. Phil Collins spent the most weeks at number one, five, with "Easy Lover", "One More Night", and "Separate Lives".

Chart history

See also
1985 in music
List of Billboard Hot 100 number ones of 1985 by Billboard
List of Cash Box Top 100 number-one singles of 1985 by Cashbox
List of number-one albums of 1985 (Canada)

References

External links
 Read about RPM Magazine at the AV Trust
 Search RPM charts here at Library and Archives Canada

 
1985 record charts
1985